Carex nemostachys is a tussock-forming species of perennial sedge in the family Cyperaceae. It is native to eastern parts of Asia.

See also
List of Carex species

References

nemostachys
Plants described in 1846
Taxa named by Ernst Gottlieb von Steudel
Flora of China
Flora of Japan
Flora of Thailand
Flora of Bangladesh
Flora of Cambodia
Flora of Myanmar
Flora of Taiwan
Flora of Vietnam